The 228 Peace Memorial Park is a historic site and municipal park located at 3 Ketagalan Boulevard, Zhongzheng District, Taipei, Taiwan. The park contains memorials to victims of the February 28 Incident of 1947, including the 228 Memorial Monument that stands at the center of the park and the Taipei 228 Memorial Museum, housed at the site of a former radio station that operated under Japanese and Kuomintang rule. The National Taiwan Museum stands at the park's north entrance. The park also has a bandshell and exercise areas.

History
The park was originally established in 1900 as Taihoku New Park(臺北新公園) during the Japanese colonial period, on former temple grounds. It was the first European-style urban park in Taiwan, placed on the grounds of the Governor-General's Office.

In 1930, Taiwan's Japanese authorities established a radio station at the site designed by Kuriyama Shunichi (栗山俊一). The station initially housed the Taihoku Broadcasting Bureau, an arm of the Government-General Propaganda Bureau's Information Office. The following year, the Taiwan Broadcast Association was formed to handle island-wide broadcasts. The Taihoku Park radio station became the center of broadcast activity for the Association.

In 1935, it was one of the sites used for The Taiwan Exposition: In Commemoration of the First Forty Years of Colonial Rule.

After the handover of Taiwan from Japan to the Republic of China in 1945, the park was subsequently renamed Taipei New Park by the government. They renamed the broadcasting agency the Taiwan Broadcasting Company. The station became the primary broadcast organ of the Kuomintang government and military.

In 1947, a group of protesters, angry over a brutal police action against Taiwanese civilians, took over the station and used it to broadcast accusations against the Kuomintang government. The action formed part of a chain of events now referred to as the February 28 Incident. A subsequent, more severe crackdown by the Nationalist government restored the station to Kuomintang control and ushered in  Taiwan's period of white terror. Two years later, the Kuomintang lost ground in the Chinese Civil War and its leaders retreated to Taiwan. Trying to establish themselves as China's true national government in exile, they renamed the bureau the Broadcasting Corporation of China (BCC).

The Taipei City government took over operation of the radio station building when the BCC moved in 1972. City officials made it the site of the Taipei City Government Parks and Street Lights Office.

As Taiwan entered its modern democracy period in the 1990s, President Lee Teng-hui offered an official apology in 1995 and invited free discussion of Taiwan's past. For the first time the February 28 Incident of 1947 was officially acknowledged and its significance openly debated. In 1996, the Taipei City Government designated the former radio station building a historical site. Two years later, the building was made the home of the Taipei 228 Memorial Museum and the park was rededicated as 228 Peace Memorial Park.

The 228 Memorial Monument was designed by Taiwanese architect Cheng Tzu-tsai, who was convicted of attempted murder in 1971 following a 1970 assassination attempt on Chiang Ching-kuo. After serving his sentence, he was imprisoned for illegal entry to Taiwan in 1991 and filed his design entry from prison. The Monument is inscribed with an exhortation for peace and unity.

On 25 November 2019, the museum was declared as a cultural asset by the Bureau of Cultural Heritage.

Cultural references
The park provides a primary setting for Pai Hsien-yung's renowned novel Crystal Boys.

Access
The nearest Taipei Metro station is National Taiwan University Hospital Station.

See also
 List of parks in Taiwan

References

Further reading

External links

  

1900 establishments in Taiwan
Memorial parks in Taiwan
Parks in Taipei
History of Taipei
February 28 incident
Peace parks
World's fair sites in Taiwan